Rho GTPase activating protein 18 is a protein that in humans is encoded by the ARHGAP18 gene. The gene is also known as MacGAP and bA307O14.2. ARHGAP18 belongs to a family of Rho GTPase-activating proteins that modulate cell signaling.

Model organisms				

Model organisms have been used in the study of ARHGAP18 function. A conditional knockout mouse line, called Arhgap18tm1a(KOMP)Wtsi was generated as part of the International Knockout Mouse Consortium program — a high-throughput mutagenesis project to generate and distribute animal models of disease to interested scientists.

Male and female animals underwent a standardized phenotypic screen to determine the effects of deletion. Twenty three tests were carried out on mutant mice and one significant abnormality was observed. Fewer than expected homozygous mutant embryos were identified during gestation.

References

Further reading 
 

Human proteins
Genes mutated in mice